Mariya Onolbayeva (born 25 December 1978 in Murmansk, Soviet Union) is a Russian female ice hockey player.  She was part of the Russia women's national ice hockey team that participated in the 2010 Winter Olympics.  Russia finished 6th out of 8 teams.

References

1978 births
Living people
Ice hockey players at the 2010 Winter Olympics
Olympic ice hockey players of Russia
People from Murmansk
Russian women's ice hockey goaltenders
Sportspeople from Murmansk Oblast